Echoes is the debut studio album by Scottish singer Maggie Reilly. It was released on 30 April 1992 by EMI. The album was produced by Armand Volker, Harald Steinhauer, Kristian Schultze and Stefan Zauner. The album includes her song "Everytime We Touch", which was a major hit in Europe in the 1990s; the album topped the Norwegian Albums Charts and was generally top 30 album.

Track listing

Personnel 

Curt Cress – drums
Stuart MacKillop – programming
Maggie Reilly – vocals
Tim Renwick – guitar
Kristian Schultze – producer
Harold Steinhauer – producer
Armand Volker – arranger, programming, producer, engineer, remixing, mixing
Peter Weihe – guitar
Stefan Zauner – arranger, keyboards, programming, producer

Charts

Sales and certifications

References

Maggie Reilly albums
1992 debut albums
EMI Records albums